William Joseph Johnston may refer to:

 Bill Johnston (politician) (born 1962), Australian politician
 William Joseph Johnston (novelist) (1924–2010), American novelist